Wallis Island is a nature reserve near Forster, New South Wales, Australia. It was created in January 1983 and covers an area of 584ha (454.5 acres). It sits within Wallis Lake, just south of the Coolongolook River. It is known for the Forster (Wallis Island) Airport and a $20 million Australian  chateau  which was built on land reportedly bought for $290,000 in 1996.

Chateau Le Marais 
The five-storey Chateau Le Marais, built by antique collectors Andre and Cecile Fink, is one of the most glamorous fishing retreats, considered to be self-sufficient with its own electricity generation system and solar panels. The property is also a private nature reserve, as it adjoins a 584ha national park on the Wallis Island. The luxurious property was initially intended to serve as the Finks' home and as a showroom for their antiques. However, following the 2007 financial crisis, the Finks' antique business took a hit and, in 2010, the couple were forced to put up the incomplete mansion for sale in 2010, with a price tag of $20 million.

In 2019, the mansion is valued at around $16 million.

References

External links
Wallis Lake Nature Reserves Draft Plan of Management

Islands of New South Wales
Nature reserves in New South Wales